Shadows Inside is the sixth studio album by American metalcore band Miss May I. Released on June 2, 2017, this was the band's first release on SharpTone Records after leaving Rise Records.

The music video for "Lost in the Grey" was directed by Ramon Boutviseth.

Track listing

Personnel 
Miss May I
Levi Benton – unclean vocals, lyrics
B.J. Stead – lead guitar, backing vocals
Justin Aufdemkampe – rhythm guitar, backing vocals
Ryan Neff – bass, clean vocals, lyrics, lead vocals tracks 3 & 6
Jerod Boyd – drums

Additional personnel
 Drew Fulk – production, engineering
 Nick Sampson – production, engineering
 Alan Douches – mastering
 Andrew Wade – mixing
 Max Klein – engineering
 Marco Mazzoni – illustrations

Charts

References

2017 albums
Miss May I albums
SharpTone Records albums